Waskaro (Sindhi وسڪارو) is a children's magazine in Sindhi published by Mehran Publication Hyderabad, Sindh. Its first issue was published in 1990. Waskaro contains short stories, poems, articles and many more things of interest of the children. Prominent Sindhi writers and poets Hameed Sindhi, Aasi Zamini, Altaf Malkani, Ustad Bukhari, Zulfiqar Ali Bhatti have written for Waskaro.

See also

 Sindhi Literature
 Gul Phul

References

1990 establishments in Pakistan
Magazines established in 1990
Mass media in Hyderabad, Sindh
Children's magazines published in Pakistan
Sindhi children's magazines